Joseph A. Canning  (October 31, 1882 – March 23, 1951) was an American Catholic priest and Jesuit. Hailing from New York City, he studied at St. Francis Xavier High School, before entering the Society of Jesus in 1898. He continued his studies at St. Andrew-on-Hudson and Woodstock College. He was ordained a priest in 1915, and spent the next eight years as a missionary in Jamaica.

He returned to the United States in 1925, and was an administrator and teacher at Jesuit schools in Washington, D.C., New Jersey, and Pennsylvania. In 1934, he became the president of Loyola College in Maryland. Upon the end of his term four years later, he returned to St. Peter's High School, and he died in Jersey City in 1951.

Early life 
Joseph A. Canning was born on October 31, 1882, in New York City. He studied at St. Francis Xavier High School in New York, before entering the Society of Jesus on August 14, 1898. He proceeded to the novitiate in Frederick, Maryland, where spent his novice and scholastic years there, with the exception of one year spent at St. Andrew-on-Hudson in Poughkeepsie, New York. He then was sent to Woodstock College in Maryland to study philosophy for three years.

Canning next taught for four years at St. Francis Xavier High School, and then for a year at the College of the Holy Cross in Worcester, Massachusetts. He then returned to Woodstock for four more years of theology. There, he was ordained by Cardinal James Gibbons as a subdeacon, deacon, and priest on June 26, 27, and 28, 1915 respectively. He celebrated his first Mass the following day. He then spent a final year at St. Andrew-on-Hudson, studying ascetical theology.

Missionary 
In 1920, following the completion of his studies, Canning was sent to Jamaica as a missionary. For eight years, he taught at St. George College in Kingston. He also ministered at Holy Trinity Cathedral and at the military station at Port Royal.

Academia 
Upon his return to the United States in 1925, Canning taught at Gonzaga College High School in Washington, D.C. He then served as prefect of studies at St. Peter's High School in Jersey City, New Jersey, before returning to Gonzaga for three years. Canning became an administrator at St. Isaac Jogues Novitiate in Wernersville, Pennsylvania for two-and-a-half years, before transferring to St. Francis Xavier High School in February 1934.

On September 2, 1934, Canning became president of Loyola College in Maryland, succeeding Henri J. Wiesel. His term as president came to an end in 1938, and he was succeeded by Edward B. Bunn.

Following the end of his presidency, he returned to St. Peter's High School in Jersey City, where he became spiritual director for the Jesuit community there. He also served as a parish priest at St. Peter's Catholic Church. Canning died in Jersey City on March 23, 1951. His funeral was held on March 26, and was attended by Thomas J. Murry, the president of Loyola College, on behalf of the school.

Notes

References

Citations

Sources 

1882 births
1951 deaths
Clergy from New York City
Xavier High School (New York City) alumni
St. Andrew-on-Hudson alumni
Woodstock College alumni
19th-century American Jesuits
20th-century American Jesuits
American Roman Catholic missionaries
Jesuit missionaries
Roman Catholic missionaries in Jamaica
Presidents of Loyola University Maryland
20th-century American academics